The piping hornbill (Bycanistes fistulator) is a bird in the hornbill family. This black-and-white species is found in humid forest and second growth in Central and West Africa, ranging from Senegal east to Uganda and south to Angola.

References

External links
 Piping hornbill, sound recordings, xeno-canto

piping hornbill
Birds of Sub-Saharan Africa
piping hornbill
Taxonomy articles created by Polbot